Willis Stanley Blatchley (October 6, 1859, North Madison, Connecticut - May 28, 1940, Indianapolis, Indiana) was an American entomologist, malacologist, geologist, and author. His studies included Coleoptera, Orthoptera, Hemiptera, and the freshwater molluscs of Indiana. Blatchley described several taxa. His home in Dunedin, Florida, the Willis S. Blatchley House, is listed on the National Register of Historic Places.

He was born in Connecticut and his parents moved to Indiana in 1860 a year later. He attended high school in Bainbridge and enrolled at Indiana University in 1883, graduating with a B.A. in 1887 and an M.A. in 1891. There he worked under ichthyologist David Starr Jordan and geologist John Casper Branner. Blatchley received an honorary degree (LL.D.) from Indiana University in 1921.

From 1887-1893 he taught at Terre Haute High School where he was Head of the Science Department from 1887-1893. From 1894-1910 he was State Geologist for Indiana.

After being defeated for re-election in 1911, he retired from public office, but continued his natural history work as an amateur. Though much of his work focused on the fauna of Indiana, he traveled to Arkansas, Alaska, Florida, Canada, Mexico, and South America (1922–23).

Blatchley married Clara A. Fordice (or Fordyce?, 1854–1928), of Russellville, Indiana, on May 2, 1882. They had two sons, Raymond Silliman Blatchley (February 11, 1883 – September 27, 1953, Los Angeles--biography) and Ralph F. Blatchley (1885–1955, Dunedin, Florida).

Bibliography

An illustrated descriptive catalogue of the Coleoptera or beetles (exclusive of the Rhynchophora) known to occur in Indiana. (1910)
Orthoptera of Northeastern America. (1920)
Heteroptera of Eastern North America. (1926)
11 papers (1927–1930) in the Florida Entomologist) on the Scarabaeidae of Florida.
The Indiana Weed Book
Boulder Reveries
Gleanings from Nature
A nature wooing at Ormond by the sea
Gold and Diamonds in Indiana
Woodland Idyls
South America As I Saw It, The observations of a naturalist
In Days Agone: Notes on the Fauna and Flora of Subtropical Florida in the Days When Most of Its Area was a Primeval Wilderness
Indiana Geology and Natural Resources
Orthoptera of Northeastern America with Essential Reference to the Faunas of Indiana and Florida
Heteroptera Or True Bugs of Eastern North America; with Especial Reference to the Faunas of Indiana and Florida
MY NATURE NOOK or Notes on the Natural History of the Vicinity of Dunedin, Florida.
The fishes of Indiana,: With descriptions, notes on habits and distribution in the state
A Catalogue of the Butterflies Known to Occur in Indiana

External links

Works at Biodiversity Heritage Library
ISGS Blatchley as a geologist.Portrait.
NDSU Biography and type information.
Scarab Workers World Directory—brief biography at Univ. Nebraska
Famous Malacologists—Illinois Natural History Survey
Dr. Willis Stanley Blatchley—Historical Marker, Dunedin, Florida
Rootsweb—information about marriage
Obituary of spouse—Clara Fordice, d. December 8, 1928, Dunedin, Florida
DUNEDIN CEMETERY, Dunedin, Pinellas County, Florida—graves of Willis Blatchley, Clara Blatchley, Ralph Blatchley

References
Anonymous. Obituary [Willis Blatchley]. Proceedings of the Indiana Academy of Science 50: 1-2.
DAVIS, J. J. WILLIS STANLEY BLATCHLEY. Annals of the Entomological Society of America, Volume 34, Number 2, June 1941, pages 279–283(5) Core Historical Literature of Agriculture—Cornell University (see also Wikispecies entry—John June Davis, 1885–1965)

Davis, Wm. T. "Dr. Willis Stanley Blatchley".  Bulletin of the Brooklyn Entomological Society 36:18-19 (1941) 

1859 births
1940 deaths
American entomologists
American geologists
American malacologists
Indiana University Bloomington alumni